The Union Solidarity and Development Party (abbr. USDP) is a political party in Myanmar. It is one of Myanmar's two principal parties, alongside the National League for Democracy. It is the successor to the former ruling military junta's mass organisation, the Union Solidarity and Development Association, and serves as the electoral proxy of the Tatmadaw (military), which operates as a state within a state. Many of its political candidates are retired generals. It supports authoritarian military leadership. It was founded by Prime Minister Thein Sein to contest the 2010 Myanmar general election and headed by him until 2013. Since 2022 it has been led by Khin Yi, who was installed as a loyalist of military leader Min Aung Hlaing.

The USDP won the 2010 general election, which was boycotted by the opposition, but lost the contested 2015 general election in a landslide and subsequently served as the parliamentary opposition. Following a second landslide victory for the National League for Democracy in the 2020 general election, the USDP baselessly alleged massive electoral fraud alongside the Tatmadaw, unsuccessfully challenged the election outcome in the courts, and called for the election to be re-run. After all constitutional means of challenging the election results were exhausted, the USDP supported the 2021 military coup d'état and assumed the presidency and multiple seats on the State Administration Council.

The USDP was the first party to register under a new junta-enacted electoral law in 2023, and has since begun campaigning for the next general election.

Leadership
On 2 May 2011, Shwe Mann assumed the office as temporary chairman of USDP. Htay Oo as deputy chairman, Aung Thaung and Thein Zaw as Secretary 1 and 2. Maung Oo was appointed as Disciplinary Official of the USDP. Former Yangon Mayor Aung Thein Lin was appointed to lead the USDP's Yangon branch.

On 16 October 2012, Thein Sein was re-elected as the chairman of the Union Solidarity and Development Party (USDP) at the USDP's first party conference in Naypyidaw.

As of October 2022, USDP leadership is as follows:

 Chairman: Khin Yi
 Vice-Chairman: Myat Hein
 General Secretary: Maung Maung Thein
 Joint General Secretary: Thein Zaw
 Secretary: Khin Aung Myint
 Secretary: Thein Swe
 Secretary: Aung Ko

Because of mounting criticism over his dual role, Thein Sein handed over the position of USDP chairman to Shwe Mann on 1 May 2013.

On 13 August 2015 it was reported that chairman Shwe Mann and general secretary Maung Maung Thein had been removed from their positions.

On 12 September 2022, Than Htay resigned as the party chairman and handed over immediately to Vice Chairman Khin Yi, the latter became Acting Chairman. On 5 October 2022, Khin Yi was elected as the new Chairman and officially assumed the party chairmanship.

Election results

House of Nationalities (Amyotha Hluttaw)

House of Representatives (Pyithu Hluttaw)

References

External links

 Official website of the Union Solidarity and Development Party

Political parties in Myanmar
2010 establishments in Myanmar
Nationalist parties in Asia
Social conservative parties
National conservative parties
Political parties established in 2010
Far-right political parties
Far-right politics in Myanmar
Internal conflict in Myanmar
Authoritarianism
Military dictatorship in Myanmar